Mats Jonasson (born 1945) is a Swedish glass designer.

He is notable for his engraved lead crystal sculptures of flowers and wildlife that are manufactured by the glassworks in Målerås, Sweden and are marketed around the world.

References

External links
 Mats Jonasson at Maleras Glasbruk

1945 births
Living people
Glass artists